Events from the year 1970 in the United States.

Incumbents

Federal government 
 President: Richard Nixon (R-California)
 Vice President: Spiro Agnew (R-Maryland)
 Chief Justice: Warren E. Burger (Minnesota)
 Speaker of the House of Representatives: John William McCormack (D-Massachusetts)
 Senate Majority Leader: Mike Mansfield (D-Montana)
 Congress: 91st

Events

January

 January 5 – The first episode of All My Children is broadcast on the ABC television network.
 January 11 – Super Bowl IV: The Kansas City Chiefs beat the heavily favored Minnesota Vikings 23–7.
 January 14 – Diana Ross & The Supremes perform their farewell live concert together at the Frontier Hotel in Las Vegas, and Ross' replacement, Jean Terrell, is introduced onstage at the end of the last show.

February
 February 17 – MacDonald family massacre: Jeffrey R. MacDonald kills his wife and children at Fort Bragg, North Carolina, claiming that drugged-out "hippies" did it.
 February 18 – A jury finds the Chicago Seven defendants not guilty of conspiring to incite a riot, in charges stemming from the violence at the 1968 Democratic National Convention. Five of the defendants are found guilty on the lesser charge of crossing state lines to incite a riot.

March
 March 6 – A bomb constructed by members of the Weathermen and meant to be planted at a military dance in New Jersey explodes, killing three members of the organization.
 March 17 
 My Lai massacre: The United States Army charges 14 officers with suppressing information related to the incident.
 The critically wounded pilot of Eastern Air Lines Shuttle Flight 1320 saves the 68 passengers and five crew of the DC-9 jet, landing safely in Boston despite being shot by a hijacker who killed the co-pilot.
 March 18 – United States Postal Service workers in New York City go on strike; the strike spreads to the state of California and the cities of Akron, Ohio, Philadelphia, Chicago, Boston, and Denver; 210,000 out of 750,000 U.S. postal employees walk out. President Nixon assigns military units to New York City post offices. The strike lasts two weeks.
 March 21 – The first Earth Day proclamation is issued by San Francisco Mayor Joseph Alioto.
 March 31 – NASA's Explorer 1, the first American satellite and Explorer program spacecraft, reenters Earth's atmosphere after 12 years in orbit.

April

 April 1
 The 1970 United States Census begins. There are 203,392,031 United States residents on this day.
President Richard Nixon signs the Public Health Cigarette Smoking Act into law, banning cigarette television advertisements in the United States, starting on January 1, 1971.
American Motors Corporation introduces the Gremlin.
 April 6 – In the worst day of California law enforcement, 4 California Highway Patrolmen are killed in what is known as the "Newhall Incident". This led to new procedures & training for law enforcement, nationwide.
 April 7 – The 42nd Academy Awards ceremony is held at Dorothy Chandler Pavilion in Los Angeles, the second in a row with no official host. John Schlesinger's Midnight Cowboy wins both Best Picture and Best Director, while George Roy Hill's Butch Cassidy and the Sundance Kid wins four awards and Charles Jarrott's Anne of the Thousand Days is nominated for ten. It is, to date, the highest-rated televised ceremony, according to Nielsen ratings.
 April 10 – Paul McCartney announces that The Beatles are breaking up. 
 April 11 – Apollo program: Apollo 13 (Jim Lovell, Fred Haise, Jack Swigert) is launched toward the Moon.
 April 13 – An oxygen tank in the Apollo 13 spacecraft explodes, forcing the crew to abort the mission and return in 4 days.
 April 17 – Apollo program: Apollo 13 splashes down safely in the Pacific.
 April 22 – The first Earth Day is celebrated in the U.S.
 April 29 – The U.S. invades Cambodia to hunt out the Viet Cong; widespread, large anti-war protests occur in the United States.

May
 May 1 
 Demonstrations against the trial of the New Haven Nine, Bobby Seale, and Ericka Huggins draw 12,000 people. 
President Richard Nixon orders U.S. forces to cross into neutral Cambodia, threatening to widen the Vietnam War, sparking nationwide riots and leading to the Kent State Shootings.
 Colorado State College changes its name to the University of Northern Colorado.
 May 4 – Kent State shootings: Four students at Kent State University in Ohio are killed and nine wounded by Ohio State National Guardsmen, at a protest against the incursion into Cambodia.
 May 8 
 Hard Hat Riot: Unionized construction workers attack about 1,000 students and others protesting the Kent State shootings near the intersection of Wall Street and Broad Street and at New York City Hall.
 The New York Knicks win their first NBA championship, defeating the Los Angeles Lakers 113–99 in Game 7 of the world championship series at Madison Square Garden.
 May 9 – In Washington, D.C., 100,000 people demonstrate against the Vietnam War.
 May 10 – The Boston Bruins win their first Stanley Cup since 1941 when Bobby Orr scores a goal 40 seconds into overtime for a 4–3 victory which completes a four-game sweep of the St. Louis Blues.
 May 11
Henry Marrow is killed in an alleged hate crime in Oxford, North Carolina.
Lubbock Tornado: An F5 tornado hits downtown Lubbock, Texas, the first to hit a downtown district of a major city since Topeka, Kansas, in 1966; 28 are killed.
Race riots erupt in Augusta, Georgia, after the suspicious death of a teenage inmate in the county jail. The disorder, the largest of its kind in the South, results in six fatalities. 
 May 12 – The 1976 Winter Olympics are awarded to Denver, Colorado, but it is later rejected.
 May 14 – In the second day of violent demonstrations at Jackson State University in Jackson, Mississippi, state law enforcement officers fire into the demonstrators, killing two and injuring twelve.
 May 26 – Pufnstuf, the film adaptation of the TV series H.R. Pufnstuf, is released.

June

 June 6 – A D-Day celebration is held in Washington, D.C., on the 26th anniversary of the event.
 June 11 – The United States gets its first female generals: Anna Mae Hays and Elizabeth P. Hoisington.
 June 21 – Penn Central declares Section 77 bankruptcy, the largest ever US corporate bankruptcy up to this date.
 June 22 – U.S. President Richard Nixon signs the Voting Rights Act Amendments of 1970, a measure lowering the voting age to 18.
 June 23 – Kelly's Heroes is released in the US.
 June 24 – The United States Senate repeals the Gulf of Tonkin Resolution.
 June 28 
U.S. ground troops withdraw from Cambodia.
First pride parade in history, Stonewall riot.
 June 30 – Riverfront Stadium in Cincinnati opens.

July
 July 1 
 The U.S. Food and Drug Administration (FDA) is subordinated to the Public Health Service.
 Colorado State College changes its name to University of Northern Colorado.
 July 4 
Bob Hope and other entertainers gather in Washington, D.C., for Honor America Day, a nonpartisan holiday event.
American Top 40, a nationally syndicated radio program featuring a countdown of the Top 40 hits of the past week according to the Billboard Hot 100, premieres. Hosted by Casey Kasem, the show is a major success.
Riots break out in Asbury Park, New Jersey.
 July 16 – Three Rivers Stadium in Pittsburgh opens.
 July 31 – NBC anchor Chet Huntley retires from full-time broadcasting.

August
 August 3 – NBC Nightly News premieres on NBC.
 August 7 – Harold Haley, Marin County Superior Court Judge, is taken hostage and murdered, in an effort to free George Jackson from police custody.
 August 13–August 15 – Special Olympics World Summer Games are held in Chicago.
 August 17 – August 18 – The U.S. sinks 418 containers of nerve gas into the Gulf Stream near the Bahamas.
 August 24 – Vietnam War protesters bomb Sterling Hall at the University of Wisconsin–Madison, leading to an international manhunt for the perpetrators. 
 August 26 – The Women's Strike For Equality takes place down Fifth Avenue in New York City.
 August 29 – The Chicano Moratorium, against the Vietnam War, begins in East Los Angeles, California, and leads to a riot that kills three people, including journalist Rubén Salazar.

September

 September 5 – Vietnam War – Operation Jefferson Glenn: The United States 101st Airborne Division and the South Vietnamese 1st Infantry Division initiate a new operation in Thua Thien Province (the operation ends in October 1971).
 September 6 – Terrorists from the Popular Front for the Liberation of Palestine hijack four passenger aircraft from Pan Am, TWA and Swissair on flights to New York from Brussels, Frankfurt and Zürich.
 September 7 – An anti-war rally is held at Valley Forge, Pennsylvania, attended by Jane Fonda, Donald Sutherland and future Democratic presidential nominee John Kerry.
 September 9 – Elvis Presley begins his first concert tour since 1958, in Phoenix, Arizona, at the Veterans Memorial Coliseum.
 September 10 – The Chevrolet Vega is introduced.
 September 11 – The Ford Pinto is introduced.
 September 13 
 The first New York City Marathon begins.
 The covert incursion of Operation Tailwind is instigated by the American forces in southeast Laos.
 September 18 – Jimi Hendrix dies at age 27 in London, due to alcohol-related complications.
 September 21 – Monday Night Football debuts on the American Broadcasting Company (ABC) television network. The Cleveland Browns defeated the New York Jets by a score of 31–21.
 September 23 – The first women's only tennis tournament begins in Houston, known as the Houston Women's Invitation.
 September 24 – American television series The Odd Couple premieres on ABC.
 September 26 – The Laguna Fire starts in San Diego County, burning 175,425 acres (710 km2).
 September 27 – Richard Nixon begins a tour of Europe, visiting Italy, Yugoslavia, Spain, the United Kingdom and Ireland.
 September 29 – The U.S. Congress gives President Richard Nixon authority to sell arms to Israel.

October

 October 2 
 The Wichita State University football team's "Gold" plane crashes in Colorado, killing most of the players. They were on their way (along with administrators and fans) to a game with Utah State University.
 Under the National Environmental Policy Act (NEPA) the Environmental Science Services Administration (ESSA) Corps, one of seven federal uniformed services of the United States, is renamed to NOAA Commissioned Officer Corps under the soon to be formed National Oceanic and Atmospheric Administration (NOAA).
 October 4 
National Educational Television ends operations, being succeeded by PBS.
In Los Angeles, rock musician Janis Joplin dies in her hotel room at age 27 from a heroin overdose. Joplin died exactly 16 days after Jimi Hendrix, both at 27 years of age.
 October 5
 The Public Broadcasting Service begins broadcasting.
 U.S. President Richard Nixon's European tour ends.
 October 8 
The U.S. Foreign Office announces that renewal of arms sales to Pakistan.
Vietnam War: In Paris, a Communist delegation rejects U.S. President Richard Nixon's October 7 peace proposal as "a maneuver to deceive world opinion."
 October 12 – Vietnam War: U.S. President Richard Nixon announces that the United States will withdraw 40,000 more troops before Christmas.
 October 15 – The Baltimore Orioles defeat the Cincinnati Reds in Game 5 of the World Series, 9–3, to win the series 4 games to 1 for their 2nd World Championship.
 October 21 – A U.S. Air Force plane makes an emergency landing near Leninakan, Soviet Union. The Soviets release the American officers, including 2 generals, November 10.
 October 25 – The wreck of the Confederate submarine Hunley is found off Charleston, South Carolina, by pioneer underwater archaeologist, Dr. E. Lee Spence, then just 22 years old. Hunley was the first submarine in history to sink a ship in warfare.
 October 26 
Garry Trudeau's comic strip Doonesbury debuts in approximately two dozen newspapers in the United States.
The record, the first above 1,000 km/h, stands for nearly thirteen years.

November
 November – The 1969–1970 recession ends.
 November 3 – Democrats sweep the U.S. Congressional mid-term elections; Ronald Reagan is re-elected as Governor of California; Jimmy Carter is elected as Governor of Georgia.
 November 4 
Vietnam War – Vietnamization: The United States turns control of the air base in the Mekong Delta to South Vietnam.
Social workers in Los Angeles, California take custody of Genie, a girl who had been kept in solitary confinement since her birth.
 November 5 – Vietnam War: The United States Military Assistance Command in Vietnam reports the lowest weekly American soldier death toll in five years (24 soldiers die that week, which is the fifth consecutive week the death toll is below 50; 431 are reported wounded that week, however).
 November 8 – Tom Dempsey, who was born with a deformed right foot, sets a National Football League record by kicking a 63-yard field goal to lift the New Orleans Saints to a 19–17 victory over the Detroit Lions at Tulane Stadium.
 November 9 – Vietnam War: The Supreme Court of the United States votes 6–3 not to hear a case by the state of Massachusetts, about the constitutionality of a state law granting Massachusetts residents the right to refuse military service in an undeclared war.
 November 10 – Vietnam War – Vietnamization: For the first time in five years, an entire week ends with no reports of United States combat fatalities in Southeast Asia.
 November 14 – Southern Airlines Flight 932 crashes in Wayne County, West Virginia; all 75 on board, including 37 players and 5 coaches from the Marshall University football team, are killed.
 November 17 – Vietnam War: Lieutenant William Calley goes on trial for the My Lai massacre.
 November 18 – U.S. President Richard Nixon asks the U.S. Congress for US$155,000,000 in supplemental aid for the Cambodian government (US$85,000,000 is for military assistance to prevent the overthrow of the government of Premier Lon Nol by the Khmer Rouge and North Vietnam).
 November 21 – Vietnam War – Operation Ivory Coast: A joint Air Force and Army team raids the Son Tay prison camp in an attempt to free American POWs thought to be held there (no Americans are killed, but the prisoners have already moved to another camp; all U.S. POWs are moved to a handful of central prison complexes as a result of this raid).
 November 23
 The American Indian Movement seizes a replica of the Mayflower in Boston. 
 Rodgers and Hammerstein's Oklahoma! makes its network TV debut, when CBS telecasts the 1955 film version as a three-hour Thanksgiving special.

December

 December 2 – The United States Environmental Protection Agency begins operations.
 December 19 – The final episode of H.R. Pufnstuf, "An Old Fashioned Christmas," airs on NBC.
 December 23 – The North Tower of the World Trade Center is topped out at 1,368 feet (417 m), making it the tallest building in the world.
 December 24 – Walt Disney Productions' 20th feature film, The Aristocats, is released. It is the studio's final film that Disney personally approved before his death. Though reception is middling compared to past efforts, the film is a box office success.
 December 29 – U.S. President Richard Nixon signs the Occupational Safety and Health Act (OSHA) into law.

Ongoing
 Cold War (1947–1991)
 Space Race (1957–1975)
 Vietnam War, U.S. involvement (1964–1973)
 Détente (c. 1969–1979)

Sport
May 10 – Boston Bruins win their fourth (and first since 1941) Stanley Cup by defeating the St. Louis Blues 4 games to 0. The deciding Game 4 is played at the Boston Garden.

Births

 January 2
 Royce Clayton, baseball player
 Eric Whitacre, composer
 Nancy St. Alban, actress
 January 3
 Christian Duguay, comic actor
 Matt Ross, actor
 January 4
Basil Iwanyk, film producer
Chris Kanyon, professional wrestler (d. 2010)
 January 6
 Julie Chen, television news anchor and host
 Keenan McCardell, American football player
 Gabrielle Reece, volleyball player and model
 January 7
 Todd Day, basketball player
 Doug E. Doug, comedian, actor and director
 January 8 – Adam Reed, voice actor and animator
 January 10 – Buff Bagwell, wrestler and actor
 January 12 – Zack de la Rocha, musician
 January 13
 Keith Coogan, actor
 Shonda Rhimes, television producer and writer
 January 15
 Bonnie "Prince" Billy, musician
 Shane McMahon, professional wrestler & businessman
 January 17 – Jeremy Roenick, hockey player
 January 20
 Edwin McCain, singer-songwriter and guitarist
 Skeet Ulrich, actor
 January 24 – Matthew Lillard, actor and producer
 January 29 
 Heather Graham, actress
 Paul Ryan, Speaker of the U.S. House of Representatives from 2015 to 2019
 February 4 – Hunter Biden, son of U.S. President Joe Biden
 February 8 – Alonzo Mourning, basketball player
 February 19 – Bellamy Young, actress, singer and producer
 March 3 – Julie Bowen, actress
 March 8 – Jason Elam, American football player
 March 12 – John Nemechek, race car driver (d. 1997) 
 March 13 – Tim Story, film director, writer, and film producer
 March 14 – Meredith Salenger, actress
 March 19 – Steve Light, children's book author and illustrator 
 March 20
 Michele Jaffe, novelist
 Linda Larkin, actress and voice actress
 Michael Rapaport, actor
 March 26 – Justin Meldal-Johnsen, songwriter
 March 29 – Richard Irvin, lawyer, politician and the mayor of Aurora, Illinois
 March 31 – Samantha Brown, television host
 April 1 – Mark Wheeler, American football player
 April 4 
 Janice Kawaye, actress and voice actress
 Tom Wiscombe, architect
 April 14 – Steve Avery, baseball player
 April 15 – Flex Alexander, actor
 April 21 – Nicole Sullivan, actress, comedian and voice artist
 April 25 – Jason Lee, actor, comedian and professional skateboarder
 May 3
 Bobby Cannavale, actor
 Jeffrey Sebelia, fashion designer
 May 5 
 LaPhonso Ellis, basketball player
 Kyan Douglas, television personality 
 Todd Newton, television personality 
 May 9
 Dostie, basketball player and TV personality
 Ghostface Killah, rapper
 Curtis Bray, American football player and coach (died 2014)
 May 10 – Craig Mack, rapper (died 2018)
 May 12
 Eric Champion, Christian musician 
 Samantha Mathis, actress
 Raj Chandarlapaty, educator and author
 David A. R. White, actor and producer
 May 14 – Daniel Lewin, American-Israeli mathematician and entrepreneur (died 2001)
 May 15
 Brad Rowe, actor, writer, producer, and public policy advocate 
 Prince Be, rapper, singer, and record producer (P.M. Dawn) (died 2016) 
 Rod Smith, American football player 
 May 22
 Brody Stevens, actor and comedian (died 2019)
 Mark Bingham, businessman and passenger on board United Airlines Flight 93 (died 2001)
 May 23
 Matt Flynn, musician
 Robert Peirce, attorney
 May 24
 Tommy Page, singer-songwriter (died 2017)
 Jeff Zgonina, American football player
 May 25 
 Lindsay and Sidney Greenbush, actresses
 Jamie Kennedy, actor and comedian
 Octavia Spencer, actress
 May 26 – John Hamburg, writer and director
 May 30 – Jeffrey Sebelia, fashion designer
 June 3 
Heather Cox, sports broadcaster
Greg Hancock, motorcycle racer
 June 15 – Leah Remini, actress, television presenter and campaigner
 June 22
 Freddy Soto, comedian and actor (d. 2005) 
 Michael Trucco, actor
 June 23 – Zen Gesner, actor
 June 26 
 Paul Thomas Anderson, screenwriter and director
 Sean Hayes, actor, comedian and producer
 Chris O'Donnell, actor
 Matt Letscher, actor and playwright 
 Nick Offerman, actor, writer and carpenter
 David Teeuwen, managing editor of USA Today (d. 2015) 
 June 28
 Steve Burton, actor
 Mike White, writer, director, actor and producer
 June 29 – Mike Vallely, skateboarder, actor, and musician
 June 30
 Chris Conrad, actor 
 Brian Bloom, actor, voice actor and screenwriter 
 July 1 – Henry Simmons, actor 
 July 2 
 Derrick Adkins, Olympic athlete
 Spice 1, rapper
 July 5 – Mac Dre, rapper (d. 2004)
 July 9 – Trent Green, American football quarterback
 July 11
 Justin Chambers, actor and fashion model
 Michael Saucedo, Hispanic Irish actor
 July 15 – Amber Hood, voice actress
 July 18 – Cheryl Casone, news anchor
 July 26 – Cress Williams, actor
 August 1 – Quentin Coryatt, American football player
 August 4
 Pete Abrams, webcomic artist
 Ron Lester, actor (d. 2016)
 August 9 
 Chris Cuomo, journalist 
 Thomas Lennon, actor, comedian, and writer 
 August 10
 Doug Flach, tennis player
 Bret Hedican, ice hockey player
 August 13 – Will Clarke, novelist
 August 15 
 Anthony Anderson, actor, comedian and writer
 Maddie Corman, actress 
 August 16 – Bonnie Bernstein, sportscaster
 August 18 – Malcolm-Jamal Warner, actor 
 August 19
 Fat Joe, rapper 
 Jeff Tam, baseball player
 August 23 – River Phoenix, actor, musician and activist (d. 1993)
 August 25
 Jo Dee Messina, singer
 Claudia Schiffer, model and actress
 August 26 – Melissa McCarthy, actress, comedian, writer, producer and fashion designer
 August 27 – Jim Thome, baseball player
 August 31 – Epic Mazur, singer and rapper
 September 3 – Maria Bamford, comedian and actress
 September 8
 Rosearik Rikki Simons, voice actor 
 Latrell Sprewell, basketball player 
 September 10 –Molly McKay, attorney and LGBT activist
 September 11 
 Taraji P. Henson, actress, singer and author
 William Joppy, boxer and coach
 Ted Leo, singer-songwriter and guitarist
 September 14 – Ketanji Brown Jackson, judge
 September 15 – Eric Garner, African-American killed by the New York City Police Department
 September 16 – Tamron Hall, journalist and tv talk show host
 September 17 – Mark Brunell, American football player and coach 
 September 18 – Aisha Tyler, actress, author, producer, writer, director and talk show host
 September 22 
 September 22
 Mike Matheny, baseball player
 Mystikal, rapper
 Chris Tallman, actor and comedian
 September 26 – Frank Guinta, politician 
 September 29 – Natasha Gregson Wagner, actress 
 October 2 – Kelly Ripa, actress and TV personality 
 October 5– Audie Pitre, singer and bass player (d. 1997)
 October 8 – Matt Damon, actor
 October 9
 David Benkof, political commentator
 Jason Butler Harner, actor 
 October 12
 Kirk Cameron, actor and Christian activist
 Charlie Ward, American football and basketball player
 October 15 – Chris Mims, American footballer (d. 2008) 
 October 18 – Jose Padilla, convicted terrorist
 October 22 – D'Lo Brown, professional wrestler 
 October 28 – Greg Eagles, actor and voice actor
 October 30
 Ben Bailey, host 
 Nia Long, actress
 October 31 – Nolan North, actor and voice-over artist
 November 4
 Anthony Ruivivar, actor 
 Tony Sly, singer (d. 2012) 
 November 5 – Heather Pick, television news anchor (d. 2008) 
 November 9
 Chris Jericho, professional wrestler
 Scarface, rapper
 Dan Schlissel, record producer
 November 10
 Orny Adams, comedian
 Warren G, rapper
 November 15 – Jack Ingram, country music singer 
 November 20
 Phife Dawg, rapper (A Tribe Called Quest) (d. 2016)
 Joe Zaso, actor and producer
 November 21 – Jonathan Greenblatt, CEO of the Anti-Defamation League
 November 27 – Mr. Lobo, television personality
 November 29 – Larry Joe Campbell, actor and comedian 
 November 30 – Walter Emanuel Jones, actor
 December 1
 Matt Sanchez, journalist and former porn actor
 Sarah Silverman, actress and comedian
 December 2
 Treach, rapper
 Joshua Seth, voice actor and hypnotist
 December 3 – Stephanie Herseth Sandlin, U.S. Representative (D-SD)
 December 4 – Fat Pat, rapper (d. 1998)
 December 9 – Kara DioGuardi, American Idol judge 
 December 10 – Kevin Sharp, country music singer, and motivational speaker (d. 2014) 
 December 12 – Jennifer Connelly, actress
 December 13 – Bart Johnson, actor 
 December 14 – Nicholas Angelich, pianist (d. 2022)
 December 18 
 DMX, rapper (d. 2021)
 Miles Marshall Lewis, author
 Rob Van Dam, professional wrestler
 December 22 
 Ted Cruz, U.S. Senator from Texas from 2013
 Clay Dreslough, game designer
 December 29
 Glen Phillips, singer-songwriter, frontman of Toad the Wet Sprocket 
 Kevin Weisman, actor
 December 31 – Bryon Russell, basketball player

Deaths

 January 5 – Cyril Fagan, Irish-American astrologer and author (b. 1896)
 January 20 – George M. Humphrey, lawyer and politician, Secretary to the Treasury (b.1890)
 February 2 – Lawrence Gray, actor (b. 1898)
 February 6 – Roscoe Karns, actor (b. 1891)
 February 7 – Abe Attell, boxer (b. 1883)
 February 11 – Lee W. Stanley, cartoonist (b. 1885)
 March 30 – Heinrich Brüning, German politician and former Chancellor of Germany (born 1885)
 April 15 – Ripper Collins, American baseball player (b.1904)
 May 9 – Louise Freeland Jenkins, astronomer (b. 1888)
 June 16 – Brian Piccolo, American football player (b. 1943)
 September 8 – Percy Spencer, inventor of the microwave oven (b. 1896)
 September 18 – Jimi Hendrix, musician, singer, and songwriter (b. 1942)
 November 26 – Benjamin O. Davis Sr. US Army General. First African-American to rise to the rank of Brigadier General. (born 1877)
 December 7 – Rube Goldberg, cartoonist, sculptor, author, engineer, and inventor (born in 1883)
 December 12 – George Terwilliger, film director and screenwriter (b. 1882)
 December 24 – Charles M. Cooke Jr., admiral (b. 1886)

See also
List of American films of 1970
Timeline of United States history (1970–1989)

References

External links
 

 
1970s in the United States
United States
United States
Years of the 20th century in the United States